The 2014 WGC-Accenture Match Play Championship was the 16th WGC-Accenture Match Play Championship, held February  at The Golf Club at Dove Mountain in Marana, Arizona, northwest of Tucson. It was the first of four World Golf Championships in 2014. With a field of 64 competitors, the five-day six-round event began on Wednesday, with the semifinals and finals on Sunday. Jason Day won his first WGC title at the 23rd hole of the final match with Victor Dubuisson.

This was the eighth and final edition of the championship contested in Marana, the host since 2007.  The tournament moved back to California in 2015, held in early May at TPC Harding Park in San Francisco, and went to Austin, Texas, in March 2016.

This was also the final edition in which the entire tournament was single-elimination, as the first two rounds were replaced by round-robin play in 2015, with sixteen players advancing to the knock-out bracket on the weekend.

Past champions in the field

Nationalities in the field

Course

 The only yardage change from 2012 was the shortening of the 11th hole from 659 to 601 yards, as it had been in 2011.

Brackets
The Championship is a single elimination match play event. The field consists of the top 64 players available from the Official World Golf Ranking on February 9, 2014. seeded according to the February 16 rankings.

Three of the top four ranked players, Tiger Woods (ranked #1), Adam Scott (2), and Phil Mickelson (4) chose not to enter and were replaced by Richard Sterne (65), Scott Piercy (66), and Kiradech Aphibarnrat (67).

Three players were appearing in their first WGC event: Victor Dubuisson, Chris Kirk and Patrick Reed.

Bobby Jones bracket

Ben Hogan bracket

Gary Player bracket

Sam Snead bracket

Final Four

Scorecard
Final match

Breakdown by country

Prize money breakdown

 Source:

References

External links

Coverage on the European Tour's official site

WGC Match Play
Golf in Arizona
WGC-Accenture Match Play Championship
WGC-Accenture Match Play Championship
WGC-Accenture Match Play Championship
WGC-Accenture Match Play Championship